The WIFA Women's Football League is the top division of women's football in the Indian state of Maharashtra. The League was first held in 2017 and is organised by the Western India Football Association (WIFA), the official football governing body of the state.

Teams
The league consists of teams from the women's divisions of the district football associations of Mumbai, Pune and Kolhapur.
Mumbai: MFA Women's League
Pune: PDFA Women's Division
Kolhapur: Kolhapur Women's League

Venue
The matches are held at Cooperage Ground.

Clubs

2022–23 season
The teams participating in the 2022–23 season:

Champions

References

Women's football leagues in India
Football in Maharashtra
Sports leagues established in 2017